A secret handshake is a distinct form of handshake or greeting which indicates membership in or loyalty to a club, clique or subculture.  The typical secret handshake involves placing one's fingers or thumbs in a particular position, one that will be recognized by fellow members while seeming to be a normal handshake to non-members.  This is most frequently associated in the popular consciousness with college fraternities, fraternal orders and secret societies.

A secret handshake can also be a useful form of familiar interaction between friends, colleagues, and family members. Secret handshakes are shared only with select and elect peoples. Usually a secret handshake has underlying meanings that differ from person to person. Secret handshakes involve a precise, sometimes complex series of movements and contact between two individuals or even a group.  Usually, these movements involve the primary use of hands, but could also involve touching feet, elbows, or in some cultures a friendly kiss.

Historical usage 

Secret handshakes cannot be traced back to a specific dated origin, but it can be determined that it is as old as any form of greeting or identification.  In the Roman mystery religion Mithraism, members were initiated with a handshake, and members were known as syndexioi (united by the handshake). The Freemasonry organizations are among the long-standing users of secret handshakes. 

The Freemasons have at least 12 known universal secret handshakes that were implemented in their society. However, there are believed to be many more unrecorded masonic secret handshakes. The secretiveness of this society is prevalent in their greetings. Fellow masons shake hands using secret handshakes, but within the society, apprentices and masters have distinctly different handshakes to identify one from another. Additionally, the Freemasons make use of the aforementioned secret signals to subtly indicate who is of what level. For instance, one handshake used between a master from an apprentice includes distinct touches on the knuckles.

Modern usage 
Handshakes, secret and otherwise, are common in the modern Western world.  The usage of secret handshakes in modern society is much more informal compared to the historical usage of secret handshakes. Where historically, a secret handshake would have a more formal, serious tone, today, secret handshakes are shared by mostly people in grade school who share a friendship type relational bond with one another.  In an informal setting, one will see young school-aged children exchanging a complex, whimsical secret handshake on the playground during break time.  Another modern form of secret handshake is dap greeting, often involving a fist bump in the sequence of contacts.

See also 
 Collegiate secret societies in North America
 Gesture
 Kushta
 Shibboleth

References 

Greetings
Hand gestures
Secrecy